The Flintstones: On the Rocks is a 2001 American animated made-for-television film featuring characters from The Flintstones franchise. It debuted on November 3, 2001 on Cartoon Network and was directed by Chris Savino and David Smith. It was dedicated to Hoyt Curtin (longtime Hanna-Barbera conductor and composer) and William Hanna (creator of The Flintstones and founder of Hanna-Barbera Productions with partner Joseph Barbera). This film was the last Flintstones production until the direct-to-video film The Flintstones & WWE: Stone Age SmackDown!. In addition to the show's traditional animation style the film also featured stop-motion animation 

It is the only Flintstones production to be produced by Cartoon Network Studios after Hanna-Barbera was absorbed into Warner Bros. Animation in 2001 (Warner Bros. later re-acquired Cartoon Network Studios from Turner Broadcasting System, reuniting Cartoon Network Studios with Warner Bros. Animation, on March 4, 2019). In format, the movie was intended to emulate the first 2 seasons of the 1960s series, which was distinctly more mature and aimed at older audiences than the later seasons, and therefore chose to focus more on the relationships between the original core cast of Fred, Barney, Wilma and Betty. The story of the film is set before the birth of Pebbles, at a time Fred and Wilma Flintstone's marriage is troubled, prompting the Rubbles to take them to Rockapulco for their anniversary vacation, to save their marriage. But while there, Fred and Wilma both find themselves tempted in other directions.

Since its original broadcast, the movie has not been released on home video, though bootleg copies exist on various torrent sites.

Plot 
Fred and Wilma's marriage is in serious jeopardy, as Wilma is growing tired of Fred's attitude, especially while Barney and Betty are enjoying a happy life well into their marriage, to the point that a visit to a family therapist results in a physical altercation between Fred and Wilma. On Fred and Wilma's anniversary, which they both forgot, the Rubbles arrange a trip to Rockapulco in an attempt to save the Flintstones' marriage.

Shortly after their arrival, a thief, Xavier, steals a diamond from a jewelry store and is chased by the guard into the same hotel the Flintstones and Rubbles are staying at. In the ensuing chaos, Xavier's bag is switched with Wilma's, and that's when he immediately begins plotting to get the diamond back. At first, things do not improve between Fred and Wilma, to the point that Wilma lashes out at Fred and very nearly decides to divorce him, but when she stumbles across the diamond in her suitcase and, assuming that Fred bought it as a surprise present, she quickly makes up with him. Capitalizing on the circumstances, Fred goes along with the charade, but finds that their newfound passion is short-lived, as Fred's demeanor slowly puts Wilma off again. While spying on Wilma, Xavier notices this and masquerades as a suave Englishman in order to woo Wilma by inviting her to dinner. Wilma accepts the invitation and spends time with Xavier.

Fred, feeling guilty, decides to make it up to Wilma, but catches her from afar with Xavier and is heartbroken, and he starts to drink himself silly while speaking with another attractive woman at the bar. Wilma rebuffs Xavier's advances out of loyalty to Fred, but changes her mind when she sees him with the lady. While dancing, however, Xavier reveals his true intentions and attempts to take the diamond from Wilma, who was wearing it as a necklace. A chase ensues throughout the ballroom with Fred, Barney and Xavier each trying to get the diamond, but fails when it eventually falls into Wilma's hands, prompting Xavier to abduct her and flee in his car. The ensuing car chase eventually leads to a bridge above a volcano, where Xavier threatens to kill Wilma if she does not hand the diamond over. Fred appears and gives a passionate speech about how he has not realized until now that even though he was not rich enough to buy the diamond, he is still the richest man in the world just by having Wilma as his wife.

Fred tries to attack him, but is no match for Xavier, who punches Fred unconscious. Wilma subdues Xavier and ends up getting him arrested by the same lady who Fred spoke with at the bar earlier, who is revealed to have been a policewoman on Xavier's trail. With their marriage restored, Fred and Wilma enjoy the rest of their trip, while Barney and Betty begin to bicker about their own marriage after seeing the passion Fred and Wilma ultimately displayed for each other. Over the end credits, Dino, who was assigned by Fred to guard their home, is revealed to have made a complete mess and left the home in the hands of his friends before leaving on his own trip.

Voice cast 

 Jeff Bergman as Fred Flintstone, Parking Guard, Vendor
 Tress MacNeille as Wilma Flintstone, Woman Scream #2
 Kevin Michael Richardson as Barney Rubble, Hector, Jewel Guard
 Grey DeLisle as Betty Rubble, Mystery Woman
 Jeff Bennett as Xavier, Club Announcer, Pool Waiter
 Frank Welker as Dino, Monkey, Elevator Guy
 Tom Kenny as Bellboy, Mammoth Vendor, Bed Monkey, Bowling Announcer
 Zelda Rubinstein as Dr. Schwartzen Quartz (Psychiatrist)
 Joey Altruda as Stoney Altruda
 John Kassir as Concierge, Bartender, Border Guard, Florist
 John Stephenson as Mr. Slate, Old Man
 Oren Waters as Singer (baritone)
 Maxi Anderson as Singer (soprano)
 Carmen Twillie as Singer (tenor)
 Wil Wheaton as Singer (bass)
 Mark Mangini as Dino (archived sound)

References

External links 
 
 

2001 films
2001 animated films
2001 television films
2000s American animated films
Cartoon Network television films
The Flintstones films
American children's animated comedy films
Animated films based on animated series
Hanna-Barbera animated films
Cartoon Network Studios animated films
Rough Draft Studios films
Films directed by Chris Savino
Films scored by Hoyt Curtin
Films produced by Genndy Tartakovsky
Films based on television series
Cartoon Network original programming
Television films based on television series